Cymatiella is a genus of predatory sea snails, marine gastropod mollusks in the family Cymatiidae.

Species
Species within the genus Cymatiella include:

 Cymatiella ansonae (Beu, 1988)
 Cymatiella columnaria (Hedley & May, 1908)
 Cymatiella eburnea (Reeve, 1844)
 Cymatiella pumilio (Hedley, 1903)
 Cymatiella sexcostata (Tate, 1888)
 Cymatiella verrucosa (Reeve, 1844)

References

Cymatiidae